Ernst Adolf Raeuschel (1740–1800) was a German lichenologist, active between 1772 and 1797, specializing in bryophytes and spermatophytes. Sometimes spelled Rauschel.

He was the author of Nomenclator botanicus omnes plantas : ab illustr. Carolo a Linné descriptas aliisque botanicis temporis recentioris detectas enumerans. . : Lipsiae :apud I. G. Feind,1797. (3rd ed.)  LCCN: agr05000967 OCLC: 15250876 Full text available . Some of the plant species described by Raeuschel include Allophylus cobbe, Callicarpa dichotoma and Elephantopus carolinianus. The Snow Lichen Stereocaulon ramulosum was described by Raeuschel in 1797.

References

1740 births
1800 deaths
18th-century German botanists